Gilbert McKay (29 May 1865 – 13 June 1954) was a Liberal Party Member of Parliament in New Zealand. Born in Dunedin, he farmed in Ōtāne in the Hawke's Bay.

Early life
McKay was born in Dunedin in 1865, the son of Gilbert McKay (1841–1922) and his wife Margaret McKay ( Houliston, 1841–1913).

Life in Hawke's Bay
McKay lived in Ōtāne and was the president of the Heretaunga Club in Hastings. A farmer, he was described as a "shrewd local politician". He was the chairman of the school committee in Ōtāne.

Political career

He won the Hawke's Bay electorate in 1922 against Reform's Andrew Hamilton Russell (Campbell had retired due to ill health), but was defeated in 1925 by Campbell.

Family and death
McKay was married three times. He married Rosina Collins (1877–1907) on 19 February 1894 and they had eight children before she died on 11 April 1907. On 24 October 1908, he married Elaine McDermott (1885–1913). They had no children but she brought a daughter (born 1906) into the union. His second wife died on 22 January 1913 aged 28. On 1 October 1913, he married Violet Person (1895–1966) of Anaroa homestead (15 km north of Ōtāne). They had four children.

McKay died on 13 June 1954.

References

1865 births
1954 deaths
New Zealand Liberal Party MPs
Members of the New Zealand House of Representatives
New Zealand MPs for North Island electorates
Unsuccessful candidates in the 1919 New Zealand general election
Unsuccessful candidates in the 1925 New Zealand general election
Unsuccessful candidates in the 1928 New Zealand general election